The Golden Corridor is the area around the Jane Addams Memorial Tollway (Interstate 90), formerly known as the Northwest Tollway, in the Chicago metropolitan area. Its name refers to the "gold" mine of economic profit for communities in the area. Several Fortune 500 company headquarters, office parks, industrial parks, exhibition and entertainment centers, medical facilities, hotels, shopping centers, and restaurants are in the Golden Corridor. With the exception of the O'Hare area of Chicago, all the communities in this region are part of a larger region known as the "Northwest Suburbs".

Cities and villages
Cities and villages in the Golden Corridor include:

Major companies

Several important companies are headquartered in or have a significant presence in the corridor.  They include:
Sears Holdings, a major department store chain headquartered in Hoffman Estates
Motorola Solutions, a telecommunications company which used to have a large presence in Schaumburg. (Its headquarters are in Chicago)
United Airlines, a major airline houses its data center in Elk Grove Township.  (Its headquarters are in Chicago)
Claire's, a retailer of accessories and jewelry to young women, headquartered in Hoffman Estates
Affiliated Computer Services, an information technology outsourcing company with offices in Schaumburg
The Nielsen Company, a marketing research firm headquartered in Schaumburg
U.S. Robotics, a manufacturer of modems headquartered in Schaumburg
United Stationers, an office products distributor headquartered in Des Plaines
Big Ten Conference, a collegiate athletics conference headquartered in Rosemont
Popular, Inc., regional offices in Rosemont
Sprint Nextel, a telecommunications company with regional offices in Rosemont and Itasca
Nexicore, a Nationwide onsite computer contractor with offices in Des Plaines
Zurich Insurance Group, North America headquarters in Schaumburg
Fifth Third Bank branch offices in the Continental Towers in Arlington Heights
Chase Bank branch offices in Elgin
Evangelical Covenant Church, a Protestant religious denomination headquartered in Chicago (O'Hare community area)
Evangelical Lutheran Church in America, a Protestant religious denomination headquartered in Chicago (O'Hare community area)
IGA, a supermarket chain headquartered in Chicago (O'Hare community area)
True Value, a hardware store chain headquartered in Chicago (O'Hare community area)
U.S. Cellular, a mobile communications service provider headquartered in Chicago (O'Hare community area)
uBid, an online auction platform company headquartered in Chicago (O'Hare community area)
XL Capital, A Corporate Insurance Company headquartered in Bermuda, Has Regional offices in Schaumburg
Siemens Medical Solutions, regional offices in Hoffman Estates
FANUC Robotics, regional offices in Hoffman Estates
NEC Display Solutions of America, regional offices in Itasca
Omron Automation Americas, United States/Americas headquarter in Hoffman Estates
STMicroelectronics, regional offices in Schaumburg
Mazak, a Japanese machine tool builder with regional offices in Schaumburg and Elgin 
THK, a Japanese machinery manufacturer with its U.S. headquarters in Schaumburg
First Midwest Bank, a bank headquartered in Chicago, Illinois
BMO Harris Bank, a Chicago-based bank with regional offices in Schaumburg
Comcast, a cable and telecommunications provider with regional offices in Schaumburg
Chicago Tribune, a Chicago-based newspaper with regional offices in Schaumburg
The Daily Herald, a suburban Chicago newspaper with headquarters in Arlington Heights and regional offices in Elgin and a printing center in Schaumburg
Verizon Wireless, a telecommunications company with regional offices in both Elgin and Schaumburg
Safeco, an insurance company with regional offices in Schaumburg
Experian (EMS - Experian Marketing Services) a credit information group with regional offices in Schaumburg
CareerBuilder.com, a career services company headquartered in Chicago (O'Hare community area)
Pace, suburban Chicago's bus transit provider headquartered in Arlington Heights
PromoWorks, a marketing services company headquartered in Schaumburg
Bystronic, a manufacturer headquartered in Hoffman Estates
DMG Mori Seiki Co., a machining manufacturer USA headquartered in Hoffman Estates
Itr Lubricants a Machining manufacturer in Dubai, United Arab Emirates
Trumpf, a manufacturer headquartered in Hoffman Estates
NSK America, a manufacturer headquartered in Hoffman Estates
Weber-Stephen Products headquarters in Palatine, Illinois and factory in Huntley
Regional offices for several major home developers including Taylor Morrison, Pulte and Lennar
Flexera Software, A software company providing software licensing, compliance and installation solutions for application producers and mid to large enterprises, with headquarters in Itasca
Expansive industrial parks in Elk Grove Village and Elgin
Great American Insurance Company, an insurance company with divisions in Schaumburg
BMW of North America, a German luxury auto manufacturer, with Regional offices in Schaumburg
Schaumburg Boomers, a professional minor league baseball team located in Schaumburg

Educational institutions
A variety of higher educational institutions are in the Golden Corridor, ranging from branch locations to community colleges to four-year colleges.
Judson University, a 4-year college in Elgin
Harper College, a very large community college at Roselle Road and Algonquin Road in Palatine
Elgin Community College, a community college in Elgin
Roosevelt University on McConnor Parkway in Schaumburg
American InterContinental University has its online campus offices in Schaumburg
Argosy University branch in Schaumburg
DePaul University branch in Rolling Meadows
Olivet Nazarene University branch in Rolling Meadows
National Louis University branch in Elgin
Illinois Institute of Art in Schaumburg
Oakton Community College in Des Plaines

Shopping centers

Ranging from regional indoor malls to chic lifestyle centers, "the Golden Corridor" is a bustling center of retail activity. Major shopping centers include:
Woodfield Mall, among the Top 10 largest malls in North America, and the largest in Illinois. Located at Golf Road and Interstate 290, just south of Interstate 90
The Streets of Woodfield, an outdoor mall of about 30 stores adjacent to Woodfield Mall.
Fashion Outlets of Chicago, an enclosed 130-store outlet mall located at River Road and Balmoral Avenue, on the east side of Interstate 294, just south of Interstate 90 and Interstate 190, in Rosemont
Algonquin Commons and the Algonquin Galleria, the largest outdoor mall complex in Illinois.
The Arboretum of South Barrington located in South Barrington, off of Illinois Route 59 and Illinois Route 72.
One of two Chicago-area IKEA locations in Schaumburg
Cabela's located in Hoffman Estates
Poplar Prairie Stone Crossing, a regional retail center located On IL Rt. 59 in Hoffman Estates

Entertainment and exhibition centers
From major arenas to convention centers to theaters to gambling centers, the Golden Corridor is a thriving entertainment center.  Major facilities include:
Allstate Arena, a 16,000-seat arena at Mannheim Road and Interstate 90 in Rosemont. The arena is the home of the Chicago Wolves AHL team, Chicago Sky WNBA team, and DePaul Blue Demons college basketball team.
NOW Arena, a 10,000-seat arena at Beverly Road and Interstate 90 in Hoffman Estates. The arena is the home of the [[Windy City Bulls [NBA G-League] team.
The Rosemont Theater, a 4,000-seat theater in Rosemont.
The Hemmens Cultural Center, a 1,200-seat theater in downtown Elgin. The theater is the home of the Elgin Symphony Orchestra.
The Donald E. Stephens Convention Center, an  convention center in Rosemont.
Schaumburg Convention Center and Renaissance Hotel, a  convention center and 500-room hotel located at Meacham Road and I-90 in Schaumburg.
Medieval Times, a dinner-theater located at Roselle Road and Interstate 90 in Schaumburg.
Legoland Discovery Center in Schaumburg.
Grand Victoria Riverboat, located in downtown Elgin, a couple miles south of Interstate 90.
Rivers Casino, a casino located at River Road and Devon Avenue in Des Plaines, on the east side of Interstate 294, just north of Interstate 90. It is Illinois' most-profitable casino.
Wintrust Field, a 7,000+ seat minor league ballpark located on Springinsguth Road in Schaumburg, a few miles south of Interstate 90.  It is home of the Schaumburg Boomers professional minor league baseball team.

Healthcare facilities
Within five miles (8 km) of the Northwest Tollway are a variety of major hospitals, including:
Sherman Hospital: off Randall Road, a half-mile south of Interstate 90 in Elgin
AMITA St. Alexius Medical Center: on Barrington Road, a half-mile south of Interstate 90 in Hoffman Estates
AMITA Alexian Brothers Behavioral Health Hospital, a half-mile south of Interstate 90 in Hoffman Estates
Northwest Community Hospital: off Central Road, a mile north of Interstate 90 in Arlington Heights
AMITA Resurrection Medical Center: a comprehensive stroke center and one of Chicago’s Emergency Medicine residency programs, just a mile north of Interstate 90 in Chicago (O’Hare area)

Hotels and restaurants
Nearly every national hotel and restaurant chain can be found along the corridor, as well as numerous independently owned and local chains.

The highest concentration of hotels can be found in the Schaumburg/Arlington Heights and Rosemont/O'Hare areas, with secondary concentrations in Hoffman Estates, Elgin, and Itasca.

Transportation infrastructure

Air transport
Chicago-O'Hare International Airport, the busiest airport in the world (by total number of takeoffs and landings), is located within the Golden Corridor
Lake in the Hills Airport, Schaumburg Regional Airport, and Chicago Executive Airport (in nearby Wheeling) provide general aviation service to the area

Mass transit
Metra's Union Pacific/Northwest Line, North Central Service, and Milwaukee District/West Line all offer commuter rail service to northwest suburban communities in the area.
CTA's Blue Line is a rapid transit train line which terminates at O'Hare and has stops at Rosemont and Cumberland, with additional stops further east, providing access to downtown Chicago and the entire CTA system.
Pace and CTA both offer scheduled fixed-route bus service to the area, with numerous routes. Pace operates an on-highway BRT service along Interstate 90 from Rosemont to Elgin. Pace's headquarters are located within the scope of the corridor, in Arlington Heights.

Limited access highways
Interstate 90 ("Jane Addams Memorial Tollway") is the primary interstate highway in the area, providing high-speed limited-access transportation for the corridor.  In addition to providing direct highway access to many of the local roads, communities, and amenities of the Golden Corridor, it also provides access to Rockford to the west and downtown Chicago to the east, and extends coast-to-coast, from Seattle to Boston.
Interstate 190 provides direct access from Interstates 90 and 294 to Chicago-O'Hare International Airport.
Interstate 290/Illinois Route 53 is a limited access highway that intersects Interstate 90 in Schaumburg near Woodfield Mall.  It provides access to the northwest suburbs to the north and to the western suburbs to the south and east, as well as access to downtown Chicago.
Interstate 294 ("Tri-State Tollway") is a limited access north-south highway that intersects Interstate 90 near Rosemont.  It provides access to the northern suburbs and Wisconsin to the north, and provides access to the western and southern suburbs as well as Northwest Indiana to the southeast.
Illinois Route 390 ("Elgin-O'Hare Tollway") is a limited access highway that runs from U.S. Route 20 in Hanover Park to Thorndale Road in Itasca, providing local access for communities in that area. An eastward extension of the expressway to the west side of Chicago-O'Hare International Airport at York Road is currently under construction, as is a northward leg to Interstate 90 and a southward leg to Interstate 294.

Highways and roads
Local east-west highways that serve the region include Stearns Road, U.S. Route 20 (Lake Street), Illinois Route 19 (Irving Park Road), Thorndale Avenue, Biesterfield Road, Devon Avenue, Illinois Route 72 (Higgins Road and Touhy Avenue), Schaumburg Road, Illinois Route 58 (Golf Road), Illinois Route 62 (Algonquin Road), Kirchoff Road, Dempster Street, Oakton Street, Euclid Avenue, Central Avenue, U.S. Route 14 (Northwest Highway/Ronald Reagan Highway), U.S. Route 12 (Rand Road), Palatine Road, Illinois Route 68 (Dundee Road), Huntley Road, and Big Timber Road.

Local north-south highways that serve the region include Illinois Route 47, Randall Road, Illinois Route 31, Illinois Route 25 (Dundee Avenue), Beverly Road, Illinois Route 59 (Sutton Road), Bartlett Road, Barrington Road, Springinsguth Road, Ela Road, Roselle Road, Plum Grove Road, Quentin Road, Meacham Road, Arlington Heights Road, Illinois Route 83 (Elmhurst Road and Busse Road), York Road, Mount Prospect Road, Wolf Road, U.S. Route 45 (River Road and Lee Street/Mannheim Road), and Illinois Route 171 (Cumberland Avenue).

See also
Illinois Technology and Research Corridor, located along Interstate 88 - a counterpart to the Golden Corridor
Lakeshore Corridor, located along Interstate 94 - a counterpart to the Golden Corridor
List of edge cities
List of technology centers

References

Chicago metropolitan area
Geography of McHenry County, Illinois
Geography of Kane County, Illinois
Geography of Cook County, Illinois
Economy of Illinois
High-technology business districts in the United States
Geography of DuPage County, Illinois
Interstate 90
U.S. Route 51